The C3 microprocessor from VIA Technologies is a fifth-generation CPU targeted at the desktop and mobile markets.

Desktop processors

C3

"Samuel 2" (150 nm) 
 All models support: MMX, 3DNow!, LongHaul
 FPU runs at 50% of core speed

"Ezra"/"Ezra-T" (130 nm) 
 All models support: MMX, 3DNow!, LongHaul
 FPU runs at 50% of core speed

"Nehemiah" (130 nm) 
 All models support: MMX, SSE, VIA PadLock (AES, RNG), LongHaul

Mobile processors

C3-M

"Ezra"/"Ezra-T" (130 nm) 
 All models support: MMX, 3DNow!, LongHaul
 FPU runs at 50% of core speed

"Nehemiah" (130 nm) 
 All models support: MMX, SSE, VIA PadLock (AES, RNG)
 VIA PowerSaver supported

External links 
 VIA C3 product page
 VIA C3-M product page
 VIA Processor specification comparison

See also
 List of VIA microprocessors

C3
VIA